
Berezove is a village in Marinka Raion (district) in Donetsk Oblast of eastern Ukraine, at 36 km SW from the centre of Donetsk city.

The War in Donbass, that started in mid-April 2014, brought both civilian and military casualties. In a clash between Ukrainian and pro-Russian troops, that took place near the village on 10 November 2014, three Ukrainian servicemen were killed and three others wounded. A 30-year-old female civilian was killed by explosion of a booby trap near the village on 8 September 2015. Two Ukrainian servicemen were killed near the village on 11 March 2017.

Demographics
Native language as of the Ukrainian Census of 2001:
Ukrainian 73.57%
Russian 25.91%
Greek 0.35%
Belorussian 0.17%

References

External links
 Weather forecast for Berezove

Villages in Volnovakha Raion